Teraporn Sang-Ano (born 3 November 1962) is a Thai boxer. He competed in the men's flyweight event at the 1984 Summer Olympics.

References

1962 births
Living people
Teraporn Sang-Ano
Teraporn Sang-Ano
Boxers at the 1984 Summer Olympics
Place of birth missing (living people)
Asian Games medalists in boxing
Boxers at the 1982 Asian Games
Teraporn Sang-Ano
Medalists at the 1982 Asian Games
Flyweight boxers
Teraporn Sang-Ano